CV Raman Nagar is one of the 224 constituencies in the Karnataka Legislative Assembly of Karnataka a south state of India. It is a part of Bangalore Central Lok Sabha constituency.

Member of Legislative Assembly
 2008: S. Raghu, Bharatiya Janata Party
 2013: S. Raghu, Bharatiya Janata Party

See also
 Bangalore Urban district
 List of constituencies of Karnataka Legislative Assembly

References

Assembly constituencies of Karnataka
Bangalore Urban district